Sandro Acerbo (born Alessandro Ancidoni; September 5, 1955) is an Italian voice actor.

Biography
Born in Rome, Acerbo began his dubbing career as a child. Among his most earliest roles include Michael Banks (portrayed by Matthew Garber) in the 1964 film Mary Poppins. He also served as the Italian voice of Patch in One Hundred and One Dalmatians, Hathi Jr. in The Jungle Book and Kurt Von Trapp in The Sound of Music.

Even as an adult, Acerbo continued dubbing characters into the Italian language. He is the official Italian voice of Brad Pitt and Will Smith as well as occasionally dubbing Hugh Grant, Dan Aykroyd, Robert Downey Jr., Matthew Broderick, Val Kilmer, Michael J. Fox and Timothy Hutton in some of their movies. Acerbo is most popular for voicing Marty McFly in the last two films of the Back to the Future film series, replacing Teo Bellia. He also became the new voice dubber of Eddie Murphy after the death of Tonino Accolla in 2013 even though the role was passed on to him in 2009.

Personal life
Acerbo is the older brother of voice actress Rossella Acerbo and former voice actor Maurizio Ancidoni and the cousin of voice actors Fabrizio and Massimiliano Manfredi. He is also married with two children. Since Maurizio Ancidoni's death in 2019, Acerbo took over as the CEO and general manager of the dubbing company CDC Sefit Group.

Dubbing roles

Animation
Mike Wazowski in Monsters University
Mike Wazowski in Party Central
Hathi Jr. in The Jungle Book
Patch in One Hundred and One Dalmatians
The Prince in Happily Ever After
Blackberry in Watership Down
Christopher Robin Winnie the Pooh and the Honey Tree
Toa Vakama in Bionicle 2: Legends of Metru Nui
Duke in Isle of Dogs

Live action
Rusty Ryan in Ocean's Eleven
Rusty Ryan in Ocean's Twelve
Rusty Ryan in Ocean's Thirteen
Agent J in Men in Black
Agent J in Men in Black II
Agent J in Men in Black 3
Mike Lowrey in Bad Boys II
Mike Lowrey in Bad Boys for Life
Marty McFly / Marty McFly Jr. / Marlene McFly in Back to the Future Part II
Marty McFly / Seamus McFly in Back to the Future Part III
Carlisle Cullen in Twilight
Carlisle Cullen in The Twilight Saga: New Moon
Carlisle Cullen in The Twilight Saga: Eclipse
Carlisle Cullen in The Twilight Saga: Breaking Dawn – Part 1
Carlisle Cullen in The Twilight Saga: Breaking Dawn – Part 2
Jimmy Olsen in Superman
Jimmy Olsen in Superman II
Jimmy Olsen in Superman III
Lenny Luthor in Superman IV: The Quest for Peace
Alex P. Keaton in Family Ties
Jerry Seinfeld in Seinfeld
Paul Maclean in A River Runs Through It
Aldo "The Apache" Raine in Inglourious Basterds
Gerry Lane in World War Z
John Smith in Mr. & Mrs. Smith
Tristan Ludlow in Legends of the Fall
Louis de Pointe du Lac in Interview with the Vampire
David Mills in Seven
Michael Sullivan in Sleepers
Frankie McGuire in The Devil's Own
Heinrich Harrer in Seven Years in Tibet
Joe Black in Meet Joe Black
Tyler Durden in Fight Club
Mickey O'Neil in Snatch
Jerry Welbach in The Mexican
Tom Bishop in Spy Game
Richard Jones in Babel
Jesse James in The Assassination of Jesse James by the Coward Robert Ford
Chad Feldheimer in Burn After Reading
Benjamin Button in The Curious Case of Benjamin Button
Mr. O'Brien in The Tree of Life
Billy Beane in Moneyball
Jackie Cogan in Killing Them Softly
Samuel Bass in 12 Years a Slave
Don "Wardaddy" Collier in Fury
Roland in By the Sea
Ben Rickert in The Big Short
Max Vatan in Allied
Glen McMahon in War Machine
Cliff Booth in Once Upon a Time in Hollywood
Roy McBride in Ad Astra
James T. West in Wild Wild West
Deadshot in Suicide Squad
Del Spooner in I, Robot
Alex "Hitch" Hitchens in Hitch
Chris Gardener in The Pursuit of Happyness
Robert Neville in I Am Legend
John Hancock in Hancock
Tim Thomas in Seven Pounds
Cypher Raige in After Earth
Judge in Winter's Tale
Jeff Bullington in Anchorman 2: The Legend Continues
Nicky Spurgeon in Focus
Bennet Omalu in Concussion
Howard Inlet in Collateral Beauty
Daryl Ward in Bright
Genie in Aladdin
Henry Brogan / Jackson Brogan in Gemini Man
Michael Banks in Mary Poppins
Kurt Von Trapp in The Sound of Music
Leo Bloom in The Producers
Steven Kovacs in The Cable Guy
Alan Simon in Torch Song Trilogy
Steven Schats in The Last Shot
Nick Tatopoulos in Godzilla
Walter Kresby in The Stepford Wives
Slide in Tower Heist
Jack McCall in A Thousand Words
Ian Malcolm in The Lost World: Jurassic Park
Willie Conway in Beautiful Girls
William Kent in The General's Daughter
Harry Sultenfuss in My Girl
Harry Sultenfuss in My Girl 2
Austin Millbarge in Spies Like Us
Steven Mills in My Stepmother Is an Alien
Brand Walsh in The Goonies
Jamie Conway in Bright Lights, Big City
Alex Finch in Chances Are
Thomas J. Whitmore in Independence Day: Resurgence
Ed Masterson in Wyatt Earp
Peter Strahm in Saw IV
Peter Strahm in Saw V
Gobler in Indiana Jones and the Raiders of the Lost Ark
Malcolm in Dawn of the Planet of the Apes
Delmar O’Donnell in O Brother, Where Art Thou?

References

External links
 
 

1955 births
Living people
Male actors from Rome
Italian male voice actors
Italian voice directors
20th-century Italian male actors
21st-century Italian male actors